

Geography
Kolmanna is a village in emerging Malappuram city of Kerala state. The area of the village 0.6 km2 (150 acres).

Kolmanna is spread on the banks of Kadalundi River which is the third longest river in Malabar after Bharathappuzha and Chaliyar.
The coordinate of Kolmanna is LAT 11.050404, LON 76.056374 
Google Map link: https://goo.gl/maps/CMFAdfLr9F72

Transportation
It is located in between Hajiyar Palli and Pattar Kadavu on the Malappuram-Vengara road, 2.5 km from the Malappuram Civil Station.  The Calicut International Airport is 25 km away from here.  The nearest Railway Station is in Tirur which is about 22 km from Kolmanna.

Official Status

Kolmanna is in Malappuram Municipality, Village office: Panakkad, Taluk:Ernad.

People
A big part of the population are Muslims followed by Hindus. Christians are very negligible in Kolmanna. The major source of income is from the family members employed in Gulf countries.  Other occupations include retail business and agriculture.

Politics
KOLMANNA is in Malappuram assembly constituency is part of Malappuram (Lok Sabha constituency).[1]

Photo gallery

References

External links
 

Villages in Malappuram district